The 1890 Missouri Tigers football team was an American football team that represented the University of Missouri as an independent during the 1890 college football season. In the school's first season of intercollegiate football, the team was led by head coach A. L. McRae and compiled a 2–1 record.

Schedule

References

Missouri
Missouri Tigers football seasons
Missouri Tigers football